Gina Smith (born November 11, 1957) is a Canadian equestrian. She won a team bronze medal as part of the Canadian Equestrian Team in dressage at the 1988 Summer Olympics in Seoul, together with teammates Cynthia Neale-Ishoy, Eva Pracht and Ashley Nicoll-Holzer. She also competed at the 1996 Summer Olympics.

References

External links
 
 
 
 
 

1957 births
Living people
Sportspeople from Saskatoon
Canadian female equestrians
Canadian dressage riders
Olympic equestrians of Canada
Olympic bronze medalists for Canada
Olympic medalists in equestrian
Equestrians at the 1988 Summer Olympics
Equestrians at the 1996 Summer Olympics
Medalists at the 1988 Summer Olympics
Pan American Games medalists in equestrian
Pan American Games gold medalists for Canada
Equestrians at the 1991 Pan American Games
Medalists at the 1991 Pan American Games
21st-century Canadian women
20th-century Canadian women